The Colonizer and the Colonized is a nonfiction book by Albert Memmi, published in French in 1957 and first published in an English translation in 1965. The work explores and describes the psychological effects of colonialism on colonized and colonizers alike. 

When it was published in 1957, many national liberation movements were active. Jean-Paul Sartre wrote the preface. The work is often read in conjunction with Frantz Fanon's Les damnés de la Terre (The Wretched of the Earth) and Peau noire, masques blancs (Black Skin, White Masks) and Aimé Césaire's Discourse on Colonialism.

Several decades later, Memmi published a follow-up book called Decolonization and the Decolonized.

References

1957 non-fiction books
Postcolonial literature